In science, an empirical relationship or phenomenological relationship is a relationship or correlation that is supported by experiment and observation but not necessarily supported by theory.

Analytical solutions without a theory
An empirical relationship is supported by confirmatory data irrespective of theoretical basis such as first principles. Sometimes theoretical explanations for what were initially empirical relationships are found, in which case the relationships are no longer considered empirical. An example was the Rydberg formula to predict the wavelengths of hydrogen spectral lines. Proposed in 1876, it perfectly predicted the wavelengths of the Lyman series, but lacked a theoretical basis until Niels Bohr produced his Bohr model of the atom in 1925.

On occasion, what was thought to be an empirical factor is later deemed to be a fundamental physical constant.

Approximations
Some empirical relationships are merely approximations, often equivalent to the first few terms of the Taylor series of an analytical solution describing a phenomenon. Other relationships only hold under certain specific conditions, reducing them to special cases of more general relationship. Some approximations, in particular phenomenological models, may even contradict theory; they are employed because they are more mathematically tractable than some theories, and are able to yield results.

See also
 Empiricism
 Heuristic argument
 Power law

References

Empiricism
Concepts in epistemology
Epistemology of science